The debtors days ratio measures how quickly cash is being collected from debtors.  The longer it takes for a company to collect, the greater the number of debtors days.
Debtor days can also be referred to as Debtor collection period. Another common ratio is the creditors days ratio.

Definition 

or

when

References 

Financial ratios